Cuba has had a socialist political system since 1959 based on the "one state – one party" principle. Cuba is constitutionally defined as a Marxist–Leninist state. The present Constitution of Cuba, which was passed in a 2019 referendum, also describes the role of the Communist Party of Cuba to be the "leading force of society and of the state" and as having the capability of setting national policy, and First Secretary of the Communist Party is the most powerful position in Cuba. The 2019 Constitution of Cuba identifies the ideals represented by Cuban independence hero José Martí and revolutionary leader Fidel Castro as the primary foundation of Cuba's political system, while also stressing the importance of the influence of the ideas of Marx, Engels, and Lenin.

The President of Cuba is Miguel Díaz-Canel, who succeeded Raúl Castro as First Secretary of the Communist Party of Cuba, the supreme leader position in 2021. Díaz-Canel is the first ruler of Communist Cuba to not hail from the family of Fidel or Raúl Castro. Executive power is exercised by the government, which is represented by the Council of Ministers, headed by the Prime Minister of Cuba. Legislative power is exercised through the unicameral National Assembly of People's Power, which is constituted as the maximum authority of the state. With effect from 10 October 2019, Miguel Díaz-Canel is the president and Manuel Marrero is the Prime Minister of Cuba. The previous president of the State Council was Raúl Castro, brother of former leader Fidel Castro; Raúl Castro remained First Secretary of the Communist Party of Cuba, and Commander-in-Chief of the Revolutionary Armed Forces until 19 April 2021. Fidel Castro ruled from 1959 to 2006, before illness forced him to hand power to his brother. Esteban Lazo Hernández is the president of the National Assembly.

Political scientists characterize the political system of Cuba as a single-party authoritarian regime where political opposition is not permitted. There are elections in Cuba, but they are not considered democratic. Censorship of information (including limits to internet access) is extensive, and independent journalism is repressed in Cuba; Reporters Without Borders has characterized Cuba as one of the worst countries in the world for press freedom.

Executive 
Executive power is exercised by the government. From February 1959 until February 2008, Cuba was led by revolutionary leader Fidel Castro, who was Head of State, Head of Government, First Secretary of the Communist Party, and Commander in Chief of the Cuban armed forces. The Ministry of Interior is the principal organ of state security and control.

According to the Constitution of Cuba, Article 94, the First Vice President of the Council of State assumes presidential duties upon the illness or death of the President. On July 31, 2006, during the 2006 Cuban transfer of duties, Fidel Castro delegated his duties as President of the Council of state, first secretary of the Cuban Communist Party and the post of commander in chief of the armed forces to first Vice President Raúl Castro. Since 2019, the President of Cuba is also limited to two five year terms.

Legislature 

Cuba has an elected national legislature, the National Assembly of People's Power (Asamblea Nacional del Poder Popular), which has 612 members, elected every 5 years and holds brief sessions to ratify decisions by the executive branch. The National Assembly convenes twice a year in ordinary periods of sessions. However, it has permanent commissions to look after issues of legislative interest. Among its permanent or temporary commissions are those in charge of issues concerning the economy, sugar industry, industries, transportation and communications, constructions, foreign affairs, public health, defense and interior order. The National Assembly also has permanent departments that oversee the work of the Commissions, Local Assemblies of the People's Power, International Relations, Judicial Affairs and the Administration.

Article 88(h) of the Constitution of Cuba, adopted in 1976, provides for citizen proposals of law, prerequisite that the proposal be made by at least 10,000 citizens who are eligible to vote. In 2002 supporters of a movement known as the Varela Project submitted a citizen proposal of law with 11,000 signatures calling for a national referendum on political and economic reforms. The Government response was to collect 8.1 million signatures to request that Cuba's National Assembly enact a constitutional amendment making socialism an unalterable feature of Cuban government.

Committees for the Defense of the Revolution 

The Committees for the Defense of the Revolution is a network of neighborhood organizations across Cuba of which most Cubans are members. The organizations are designed to put medical, educational or other campaigns into national effect, and to report "counter-revolutionary" activity. It is the duty of the CDR officials to know the political activities of each person in their respective blocks.

Political parties and elections 

Suffrage is non-compulsory and is afforded to Cuban citizens who have resided for two years on the island. Such citizens must be aged over sixteen years, must not have been found guilty of a criminal offense, and cannot be mentally handicapped. Cubans living abroad are denied the right to vote. The national elections for the 612 members of the National Assembly of People's Power are held according to this system and the precepts of the 1976 Constitution.

Under the system, neighbors meet to propose the candidates to the Municipal Assemblies in a public, show of hands vote. The candidates do not present a political platform, but only their resumes. No political party, not even the Communist Party of Cuba, is permitted to nominate or campaign for any candidate. The municipal candidates elected in each neighborhood then elect the Municipal Assembly members. In turn, the Municipal Assembly members elect the Provincial Assembly members, who in turn elect the national Assembly members. A direct vote is then cast to decide whether the decanted members that appear in the final step need to be ratified.

|-
!style="background-color:#E9E9E9;text-align:left;vertical-align:top;" width=400|Members
!style="background-color:#E9E9E9"|Seats
|-
| style="text-align:left;" |609 candidates (one candidate per seat). Up to 50% of the candidates must be chosen by the Municipal Assemblies. The candidates are otherwise proposed by nominating assemblies, which comprise representatives of workers, youth, women, students and farmers as well as members of the Committees for the Defense of the Revolution, after initial mass meetings soliciting a first list of names. The final list of candidates is drawn up by the National Candidature Commission taking into account criteria such as candidates' merit, patriotism, ethical values and revolutionary history.
|609
|-
|style="text-align:left;background-color:#E9E9E9"|Total elected
|width="30" style="text-align:right;background-color:#E9E9E9"|609
|}

State leaders

Communist Party of Cuba 

First Secretary: Miguel Díaz-Canel Bermúdez
Second Secretary: Jose Ramon Machado Ventura
Members of Politburo: Miguel Mario Díaz-Canel Bermúdez, Juan Esteban Lazo Hernández, Salvador Valdés Mesa, José Ramón Machado Ventura, Roberto Morales Ojeda, Álvaro López Miera, Bruno Rodríguez Parrilla, Abelardo Álvarez Gil, Ulises Guilarte de Nacimiento, Teresa María Amarelle Bué, Marta Ayala Ávila, Manuel Marrero Cruz, José Amado Ricardo Guerra, Luis Alberto Rodríguez López-Calleja, Lázaro Alberto Álvarez Casas, Gladys Martínez Verdecia.
Members of Secretariat: Miguel Díaz-Canel, Jose Ramon Machado Ventura, Abelardo Álvarez Gil, Roberto Morales Ojeda, Rogelio Polanco Fuentes, Joel Queipo Ruiz, José Ramón Monteagudo Ruiz, Félix Duarte Ortega, Jorge Luis Broche Lorenzo.

Council of State 

President: Juan Esteban Lazo Hernández
First Vice President: Ana María Mari Machado
Vice Presidents: Juan Esteban Lazo Hernández, Gladys María Bejerano Portela, José Ramón Machado Ventura
Secretary: Homero Acosta Álvarez

Council of Ministers 

Prime Minister: Manuel Marrero
First Deputy Prime Minister: Salvador Valdés Mesa
Deputy Prime Ministers: Marino Alberto Murillo Jorge, Ulises Rosales del Toro, Ramiro Valdés Menéndez, Ricardo Cabrisas Ruíz, Antonio Enrique Lussón Batlle
Minister of Interior: Lázaro Alberto Álvarez Casas
Minister of the Armed Forces: Álvaro López Miera

National Assembly of People's Power 

President: Esteban Lazo Hernández
Vice President: Jaime Alberto Crombet Hernández-Baquero
Secretary: Miriam Brito Sarroca

Foreign relations 

Cuba's foreign policy has been scaled back and redirected as a result of economic hardship after the collapse of the Soviet bloc. Without massive Soviet subsidies and its primary trading partner Cuba was comparatively isolated in the 1990s, but has since entered bilateral co-operation with several South American countries, most notably Venezuela and Bolivia. Cuba has normal diplomatic and economic relations with every country in the Western hemisphere except El Salvador and the United States. El Salvador, under the new government of Mauricio Funes, is expected to institute both in June, 2009.
The United States continues an embargo "so long as [Cuba] continues to refuse to move toward democratization and greater respect for human rights."
The European Union accuses Cuba of "continuing flagrant violation of human rights and fundamental freedoms", but also "Reiterates its condemnation of the US embargo on Cuba, and calls for it to be lifted forthwith, as the UN General Assembly has repeatedly demanded."

Cuba has developed a growing relationship with the People's Republic of China and Russia. In all, Cuba continues to have formal relations with 160 nations, and provided civilian assistance workers – principally medical – in more than 20 nations. More than two million exiles have escaped to foreign countries. Cuba's present foreign minister is Bruno Rodríguez Parrilla.

Authoritarianism 

Political scientists characterize the political system of Cuba as non-democratic and authoritarian. It is a single-party authoritarian regime where political opposition is not permitted. There are elections in Cuba but critics challenge whether they are democratic. Censorship of information (including limits to internet access) is extensive, and independent journalism is repressed in Cuba; Reporters Without Borders has characterized Cuba as one of the worst countries in the world for press freedom.

Officially, Cuba frames itself as a "people's democracy", as opposed to the "liberal democracy" of Western states. Cuba thus rejects criticism of its political system as a lack of appreciation for different forms of democracy other than those in capitalist states. It alludes to the grass roots elements in the nomination of candidates at neighborhood level (in the so-called circunscripciones).

Opposition groups inside and outside the country as well as a summary published by Human Rights Watch and certain foreign governments have described the Cuban political system as undemocratic. The United States Government has initiated various policy measures; these have been ostensibly designed to urge Cuba to undertake political change towards a multi-party electoral system. These plans have been condemned by the Cuban Government, who accuses the United States of meddling in Cuba's affairs.

Human rights 

According to Human Rights Watch, Castro constructed a "repressive machinery" that continues to deprive Cubans of their basic rights. The Cuban government has been accused of numerous human rights abuses, including torture, arbitrary imprisonment, unfair trials, and extrajudicial executions (a.k.a. "El Paredón"). Human Rights Watch reports that the government represses nearly all forms of political dissent. There are many restrictions on leaving the country.

The country's first ever transgender municipal delegate was elected in the province of Villa Clara in early 2013. Adela Hernández is a resident of the town of Caibarién and works as a nurse electrocardiogram specialist. In Cuba, delegates are not professional politicians and, therefore, do not receive a government salary.

Corruption 

The 2012 Transparency International Corruption Perceptions Index ranked the Cuba 58th out of 176 countries, tied with Jordan and Namibia. and has lower levels than most of the other countries in the Caribbean and Central America. In 2006, it was ranked in 112th place, tied with India.

References

Further reading 

Erikson, Daniel P. (2005). "Charting Castro's Possible Successors". SAIS Review 25.1, 89–103.
Evenson, Debra (1994). Revolution in the balance: Law and society in contemporary Cuba. Westview Press, Boulder. .
 Grenier, Yvon (2017), Culture and the Cuban State; Participation, Recognition, and Dissonance under Communism (Lexington Books)
(fr) Danielle Bleitrach and Jean-François Bonaldi, Cuba, Fidel et le Che ou l'aventure du socialisme,  Editions Le Temps des Cerises, 2009 .

External links 

Cubaweb – Official Cuban Web Portal
Gobierno de la República de Cuba – Government of the Republic of Cuba
Cuban Parliament
People's Supreme Court